

QI02A Cattle

QI02AA Inactivated viral vaccines
QI02AA01 Bovine viral diarrhea (BVD)
QI02AA02 Bovine respiratory syncytial virus (BRSV)
QI02AA03 Bovine rhinotracheitis virus (IBR)
QI02AA04 Foot and mouth disease virus
QI02AA05 Bovine parainfluenza virus + bovine adenovirus + bovine reovirus
QI02AA06 Bovine parainfluenza virus + bovine adenovirus + bovine reovirus + bovine rhinotracheitis virus
QI02AA07 Bovine parainfluenza virus + bovine adenovirus + bovine reovirus + bovine respiratory syncytial virus
QI02AA08 Bluetongue virus

QI02AB Inactivated bacterial vaccines (including mycoplasma, toxoid and chlamydia)
QI02AB01 Clostridium
QI02AB02 Mycobacterium
QI02AB03 Leptospira
QI02AB04 Pasteurella
QI02AB05 Salmonella
QI02AB06 Escherichia
QI02AB07 Coxiella + chlamydia
QI02AB08 Escherichia + salmonella + pasteurella + streptococcus
QI02AB09 Escherichia + salmonella
QI02AB10 Escherichia + salmonella + pasteurella
QI02AB11 Clostridium + pasteurella
QI02AB12 Clostridium + salmonella
QI02AB13 Escherichia + streptococcus
QI02AB14 Pasteurella + streptococcus + corynebacterium
QI02AB15 Chlamydia
QI02AB16 Streptococcus + staphylococcus + pseudomonas + corynebacterium
QI02AB17 Escherichia + staphylococcus
QI02AB18 Streptococcus

QI02AC Inactivated bacterial vaccines and antisera
Empty group

QI02AD Live viral vaccines
QI02AD01 Bovine rhinotracheitis virus (IBR)
QI02AD02 Bovine viral diarrhea (BVD)
QI02AD03 Bovine viral diarrhea + bovine respiratory syncytial virus
QI02AD04 Bovine respiratory syncytial virus (BRSV)
QI02AD05 Bovine parainfluenza virus
QI02AD06 Bovine rhinotracheitis virus + bovine parainfluenza virus
QI02AD07 Bovine respiratory syncytial virus + bovine parainfluenza virus
QI02AD08 Bovine rotavirus + bovine coronavirus
QI02AD09 Bovine rotavirus
QI02AD10 Bovine coronavirus

QI02AE Live bacterial vaccines
QI02AE01 Mycobacterium
QI02AE02 Salmonella
QI02AE03 Escherichia
QI02AE04 Bacillus anthracis
QI02AE05 Mycoplasma

QI02AF Live bacterial and viral vaccines
Empty group

QI02AG Live and inactivated bacterial vaccines
Empty group

QI02AH Live and inactivated viral vaccines
Empty group

QI02AI Live viral and inactivated bacterial vaccines
QI02AI01 Live bovine rotavirus + live bovine coronavirus + inactivated escherichia

QI02AJ Live and inactivated viral and bacterial vaccines
Empty group

QI02AK Inactivated viral and live bacterial vaccines
Empty group

QI02AL Inactivated viral and inactivated bacterial vaccines
QI02AL01 Bovine rotavirus + bovine coronavirus + escherichia
QI02AL02 Bovine rotavirus + bovine coronavirus + parvovirus + escherichia
QI02AL03 Bovine rotavirus + escherichia
QI02AL04 Bovine parainfluenza virus + bovine respiratory syncytial virus + pasteurella
QI02AL05 Bovine rotavirus + bovine coronavirus + clostridium + escherichia

QI02AM Antisera, immunoglobulin preparations, and antitoxins
QI02AM01 Escherichia antiserum
QI02AM02 Salmonella antiserum
QI02AM03 Pasteurella antiserum + salmonella antiserum + streptococcus antiserum + escherichia antiserum
QI02AM04 Escherichia antiserum + pneumococci antiserum
QI02AM05 Bovine rotavirus antiserum + bovine coronavirus antiserum + escherichia antiserum
QI02AM06 Salmonella antiserum + pasteurella antiserum + escherichia antiserum
QI02AM07 Salmonella antiserum + escherichia antiserum
QI02AM08 Pasteurella antiserum

QI02AN Live parasitic vaccines
QI02AN01 Dictyocaulus

QI02AO Inactivated parasitic vaccines
QI02AO01 Dictyocaulus

QI02AP Live fungal vaccines
QI02AP01 Trichophyton

QI02AQ Inactivated fungal vaccines
QI02AQ01 Trichophyton

QI02AR In vivo diagnostic preparations
QI02AR01 Bovine tuberculin PPD
QI02AR02 Avian tuberculin PPD

QI02AS Allergens
Empty group

QI02AT Colostrum preparations and substitutes
QI02AT01 Escherichia

QI02AU Other live vaccines
Empty group

QI02AV Other inactivated vaccines
Empty group

QI02AX Other immunologicals
Empty group

QI02B Buffalo
Empty group

QI02X Bovidae, others
Empty group

Notes

References

I02